The 2016 presidential campaign of Marco Rubio, who is currently the senior United States senator from Florida, was formally announced on April 13, 2015, at an event at the Freedom Tower in Downtown Miami.  Early polling showed Rubio, who was considered a potential candidate for Vice President by Republican presidential nominee Mitt Romney in 2012,  as a frontrunner candidate for the Republican nomination for president of the United States in 2016 since at least the end of the 2012 election. Rubio was the second Cuban American to run for president of the United States, with Republican Ted Cruz announcing his campaign three weeks earlier. He suspended his campaign on March 15, 2016, after finishing second in Florida's primary.

Background

2012 presidential election

As early as January 2011, there had been speculation that he might seek the office of the president or vice-president. In January 2011, Rubio stated he had no interest in being the vice-presidential candidate in the 2012 presidential election. Despite his comments, speculation continued that presidential candidate Mitt Romney might select Rubio as his running mate. According to the book Double Down, Romney's campaign narrowed down his list of potential nominees for vice president to five candidates, one of which was Rubio. However, Romney ultimately picked Wisconsin congressman Paul Ryan.

2016 presidential election

Throughout 2014, groups had been raising money to support a potential Rubio presidential campaign. Groups supporting Rubio raised over $530,000 in the first three months of 2014, most of which was spent on consultants and data analytics, in what was seen as preparations for a presidential campaign.
 
Early polling data showed Rubio as a frontrunner for the nomination shortly after the 2012 election. From late 2012 to mid-2013, Rubio came in first in eight consecutive national polls among potential 2016 candidates, from such sources as Public Policy Polling, Harper Polling, Quinnipiac University, and Farleigh Dickinson University. In statewide polls, he had performed most prominently in his home state of Florida, alongside Jeb Bush, and has also performed fairly well in Suffolk University polls in such states as Colorado, Michigan, and Minnesota. A poll from the WMUR/University, tracking New Hampshire Republican primary voters' sentiment, showed Rubio at the top alongside Kentucky senator Rand Paul in March 2013. However, he had dropped to 10th place behind other Republican contenders by April 2014. The poll, however, also suggested that Rubio was not disliked by primary voters, which could have been positive for him had other candidates chosen not to run. By the time of Rubio's announcement, he had regained some standing in the polls. A March 2015 NBC/Wall Street Journal poll asked Republican Party voters if they could see themselves supporting the various candidates. Rubio won the poll with 56 percent of Republican voters saying they could see themselves supporting Rubio, while only 26 percent said they could not. Wisconsin governor Scott Walker and former Arkansas governor Mike Huckabee trailed just behind Rubio with 53 and 52 percent, respectively. A CNN/ORC poll conducted from March 13 to March 15, 2015, found that Rubio was tied with Chris Christie for the Republican nomination.

In January 2015, Rubio began laying the foundation for a presidential campaign. He began contacting top donors and appointed advisors, including George Seay, who previously worked on Rick Perry's 2012 presidential campaign and Mitt Romney's 2008 presidential campaign, and Jim Rubright, who had previously worked for Jeb Bush, Romney, and John McCain. Rubio also instructed his aides to "prepare for a presidential campaign" prior to a Team Marco 2016 fundraising meeting in South Beach.

Campaign

On March 30, 2015, Rubio announced on Fox News and through social media that he would be making a "big announcement" on April 13 in Miami, Florida. While he did not specify whether the announcement pertained to his reelection as a United States Senator or for the Presidency, most media consensus was that Rubio would be announcing his presidential run. He made the announcement at the Freedom Tower in Downtown Miami. In his announcement speech, Rubio cast himself as forward-looking and a leader for a new generation of Americans, in contrast to Democrat Hillary Clinton, who announced her presidential campaign the day before; in addition, he announced he would not seek re-election as senator. With the announcement, Rubio became the fourth major candidate to officially announce a run after Republicans (and fellow senators) Ted Cruz of Texas and Rand Paul of Kentucky and Democrat Hillary Clinton.

Although Rubio initially struggled to poll as well as other frontrunners such as Chris Christie, Jeb Bush, Scott Walker, and Donald Trump, Rubio's performance in the debates was widely seen as a boosting factor in his rising poll numbers in the late summer and fall of 2015. Over the course of both of the first two debates, in August and September, Rubio was widely praised as one of the top performers, even being called the winner by some analysts. As a result, Rubio's poll numbers began to increase once more, and he eventually reached the #3 position in most polling averages, only behind Trump and Ben Carson. Another factor that was seen as greatly improving Rubio's chances was the exit from the race of Scott Walker on September 21. Analysts claimed that many of Walker's supporters and donors were turning to him as a viable alternative to Bush, who could also claim broad appeal to both moderates and conservatives. With Walker out of the race, Rubio was widely viewed as the next likeliest candidate who best matched this criteria. The Rubio campaign was even reported as hiring up to nine of Walker's former top staffers less than 24 hours after his exit.

Matt Lewis has commented that, "Democrats should fear Marco Rubio", who Lewis saw as  "heralding a generational shift" for Republicans. Rubio, along with Paul Ryan and his recent ascension to the House speakership, Lewis says, means "both men will be attacked for their youth and energy", adding: "But it's hard to look at this strong and diverse Republican bench, and not juxtapose it to the Democrats, whose party – now that Barack Obama is a lame duck – seems to be represented by a bunch of old white people, such as Hillary Clinton, 68, Bernie Sanders, the 74-year-old democratic socialist candidate, ...Nancy Pelosi, 75, and Harry Reid, 75... For Democrats, who were hoping they would get to deal with old pols like John Boehner and Jeb Bush...the world just got a little bit scarier".

The November 2015 Paris attacks were widely seen as altering the narrative of the 2016 presidential primaries, and in particular gave a boost to Rubio for his foreign policy stances, in comparison to such candidates who were softer on foreign policy such as Carson, and also for his having political experience, in contrast to other front-runners such as Trump.

During the latter part of 2015, Rubio's voting record in the senate came under scrutiny. Jeb Bush, during the CNBC debate on October 28, told Rubio that he could either campaign or resign, Rubio responding that Bush had not made similar comments about the voting record of John McCain during his 2008 presidential campaign and concluded that Bush was only criticizing "because we're running for the same position and someone has convinced you that attacking me is going to help you." In December, while in Iowa, fellow presidential candidate Chris Christie mentioned Rubio missing a vote on a national spending bill the senator opposed and added, "Just show up to work and vote no, and like if you don't want to, then quit." On December 29, Rubio responded to Christie by claiming to have close to a 90% attendance record while also retorting that the governor had "been missing in New Jersey half of the time." In late December, Right to Rise, a Jeb Bush super PAC, released an ad claiming that Rubio had both missed a classified meeting the previous month after the Paris attacks and "missed more total votes than any other senator". On January 7, Rubio defended his record by arguing that votes were "precooked" and votes were used to "make a statement."

Rubio participated in the January 28 Fox News debate, charging Cruz with building his campaign on "the lie" stemming from his stance on immigration and insisting in Jeb Bush's book Immigration Wars: Forging an American Solution that the latter changed his "position on immigration". January 29, during an interview the following day, Rubio was confident about his chances in Iowa, though did not deny that Ted Cruz was the frontrunner since by Rubio's admission, "He's spent basically all of his money in Iowa."

Early primaries
Rubio finished in third place in the Iowa caucus on February 1. Though polling had shown him in third place prior to the caucus, the result was still treated as a surprisingly strong showing. Amber Phillips of The Washington Post wrote of Rubio's performance, "He over-performed expectations, and for that, Rubio perhaps almost as much as Cruz can call Monday a win." After being projected in third place, Rubio said in a speech that he had defied expectations and swore that when he was the nominee of the election cycle, "we are going to unify this party, and we are going to unify the conservative movement". A little over a week after the primary, on February 10, Rubio accused Cruz of having misled voters through claiming fellow candidate Ben Carson would be ending his campaign in what he called "a concerted effort that I'm sure they planned to execute on something in order to influence the election."

Going into New Hampshire, Rubio by February 5, four days after the Iowa victory, was polling at an average of 16%. This placed him in second place, behind Trump.
At the New Hampshire debate on February 6, 2016, Rubio was criticized by Christie for repeating memorized speeches, to which Rubio replied by repeating four times a statement to the effect that President Obama was destroying America. Rubio defended these remarks the following day, saying with respect to the statement that Obama "knows exactly what he's doing" that "It's what I believe and it's what I'm going to continue to say, because it happens to be one of the main reasons why I am running." Rubio came in fifth place during the New Hampshire primary on February 9. Shortly afterward, Rubio admitted to supporters that he was disappointed and concluded that his debate performance three days prior had not helped him in the state. Chris Christie, who came in sixth place behind Rubio, dropped out the following day. Rubio responded to his ended candidacy by praising him.

Campaigning in South Carolina on February 11, Rubio charged Trump and Bush with having no foreign policy experience and acknowledged John Kasich as experienced in that regard, but not having been involved with foreign policy "in a long time." Rubio participated in the February 13 CBS News debate, exchanging with Cruz over the latter's claim regarding Rubio's comments in Spanish during an appearance on Univision. Rubio responded by claiming that Cruz did not know how to speak Spanish, Cruz retorting through speaking the language. The following day, February 14, Rubio denied that he was attempting to call into question Cruz's legitimacy as a Latino, instead having meant to question if he understood him and, he added, regarding Cruz, "He's just going off what other people are telling him, and it's false. It's just not true." On February 17, Governor of South Carolina Nikki Haley endorsed Rubio. Haley's endorsement was seen as helpful to Rubio, exit polls after the primary having one in four voters indicate that they had supported Rubio only after the governor's endorsement. In the South Carolina primary on February 20, Rubio finished in second place at 22%, but won zero delegates from the state. Jeb Bush came in fourth place and then suspended his campaign. In his speech afterward, Rubio said the primary had "become a three person race, and we will win the nomination".

The next voting state, Nevada, was seen as one that Rubio could potentially claim as his first victory due to the outpouring of support from the Republican Party. Some commentators observed Rubio having spent six years of his childhood in the state as a potential advantage over the other candidates in appealing to voters. Rubio acknowledged his roots within the state, but believed that he was similar to the other candidates in having to "compete hard" for a victory. A poll was released on February 17 showing Rubio in second place at 19%, twenty-six points behind Trump who was at 45%. Nevada lieutenant governor Mark Hutchison publicly expressed confidence in Rubio's chances, as did the candidate himself. However, on February 23, the day of the primary, Rubio finished in second place, behind Trump. The victory widened Trump's lead over the others, leading to a belief that he was going to become the nominee regardless of the results of Super Tuesday. Following the second-place finish, aides of Rubio said he would only win if supporters of both Kasich, who was still running despite poor performances in nearly every one of the four states, and Bush coalesced behind him.

Rubio participated in the CNN debate on February 25, having heated exchanges with front-runner Donald Trump. On February 26, Rubio followed up on his performance the previous day at a rally in Dallas by mocking Trump's misspelled tweets and suggested Trump's "pants were wet". Rubio made further comments about Trump which included remarks denouncing his privileged background as having made him unfamiliar with financial difficulties and his physical appearance. Weeks later, Rubio regretted mocking Trump in this manner, stating that his "kids were embarrassed by it".

Super Tuesday; March contests 
Leading up to Super Tuesday, there were mixed reactions to how well Rubio would perform. The following day, Rubio withdrew from planned appearances in Kentucky and Louisiana that were scheduled in the latter part of the week, leading to speculation that the move was the result of a lack of confidence the Rubio campaign had in its chances to win the two states, polling at the time showing Trump in first place.

On March 6, Rubio had won the Puerto Rico Republican primary by a large margin, pulling in 71.02% of the vote. He took all twenty-three delegates. Rubio previously addressed Puerto Rico during a CNN debate, arguing that its problems stemmed from an economy that was not growing and that it was "too expensive to do business there." He also blamed Puerto Rico governor Alejandro García Padilla for not cutting government spending, Padilla afterward charging him with being employed by the "vultures that fund his campaign." For the March 8 contests offering over 140 delegates, Rubio won one delegate from Hawaii and zero delegates from three other states: Idaho, Michigan and Mississippi. He was third in Hawaii and Idaho, but ranked fourth in Michigan and Mississippi with less than 10% of the vote. This left him with a total of 152 delegates compared to Trump's 459 and Cruz's 360; so Rubio would still be behind even if he won Florida's 99 delegates. Also on that day, the Cruz campaign distributed an email indicating that Rubio was being advised to drop out, Rubio responding to the charge denying that he was withdrawing from the race, and his spokesman concluded that Cruz was "up to his dirty tricks again spreading false rumors and lies."

Florida loss; suspension 
In early March 2016, there became a consensus that Rubio would have to win his home state to remain a credible candidate in the race, political science professor Stephen Craig saying the senator would be "dead meat" if he did not win Florida and further questioned if even a victory would be enough to sustain his campaign. Rubio expressed confidence that he would win Florida. Rubio's campaign was reported to be aiming for Ohio voters to support Kasich over him to beat Trump, while in contrast describing Rubio as the only candidate able to beat Trump in Florida. On March 11, CNN averaged six March polls for Florida and found that Rubio was scoring 26% support, less than Trump's 40%. Rubio's last rally, the night before the results, was at Palm Beach Atlantic University in West Palm Beach, FL, just miles from Donald Trump's Mar-a-Lago, where he spoke optimistically of the next day ahead. On the day of the Florida primary, Rubio said that his campaign would continue to Utah regardless of the results and charged the polls, all of which showing him behind Trump, as being "out of control."

On March 15, 2016, Rubio suspended his campaign, when he finished second in the primary of his home state of Florida held that day. Rubio won in only 1 (Miami-Dade) of Florida's 67 counties, and his Florida vote share was 27.0%; Trump won 45.7% and all of Florida's delegates. The conclusion of the six March 15 contests (out of which Rubio won none) left Rubio with 169 delegates on the race to reach 1237, but Ted Cruz already had 411 and Trump 673.

Fundraising
A Super PAC in support of Rubio, Conservative Solutions PAC, was launched in the beginning of April 2015. It is led by Warren Tompkins. Miami businessman Norman Braman was named by political commentators as a probable large donor.

Rubio raised about $1.25 million online the day after his announcement. By the three-month mark of his campaign – July 13 – Rubio had raised over $12 million. Between July and September, Rubio acquired $5.7 million for the campaign, noted by ABC News as being less than the garnered finances of rivals Ted Cruz, Carly Fiorina and Ben Carson, the latter having triple of Rubio's total. By Christmas Rubio raised a total of $47,713,472. It was reported in January that Rubio was canceling a fundraiser to attend a senate meeting, one reportedly having to do with the current affairs of North Korea. That month, Rubio raised roughly $5 million. On March 16, the day after Rubio announced the suspension of his campaign, he met with donors, summarizing the end of the campaign, "We had a great season but we didn't get to the Super Bowl and we didn't win the Super Bowl".

Endorsements

U.S. Governors (current and former)

U.S. Senators (current and former)

U.S. Representatives (current and former)

U.S. Ambassadors (former)

Republican National Committee members (current)

Republican National Committee members (former)

Statewide officials

State legislators

Mayors and other municipal leaders

International Politicians

Businesspeople

Newspapers

Celebrities, commentators, and activists

See also

 Political positions of Marco Rubio
 Republican Party presidential primaries, 2016 
 Republican Party presidential candidates, 2016
 Republican Party presidential debates, 2016

References

External links
 Marco Rubio video released prior to official Presidential announcement
 Official Marco Rubio campaign website
 C-SPAN coverage of Rubio's campaign announcement

2016 Republican Party (United States) presidential campaigns
Marco Rubio